Matheus de Araújo Andrade (born 22 May 2002), commonly known as Matheus Araujo, is a Brazilian footballer who currently plays as a midfielder for Corinthians.

Career statistics

Club

reserva do RZK (Raulzika)

References

2002 births
Living people
People from Osasco
Brazilian footballers
Brazil youth international footballers
Association football midfielders
São Bernardo Futebol Clube players
União Agrícola Barbarense Futebol Clube players
Sport Club Corinthians Paulista players
Footballers from São Paulo (state)